A tabla is a pair of twin hand drums from the Indian subcontinent, that are somewhat similar in shape to the bongos. Since the 18th century, it has been the principal percussion instrument in Hindustani classical music, where it may be played solo, as accompaniment with other instruments and vocals, and as a part of larger ensembles. It is frequently played in popular and folk music performances in India, Bangladesh, Afghanistan, Pakistan, Nepal and Sri Lanka. The tabla is an essential instrument in the bhakti devotional traditions of Hinduism and Sikhism, such as during bhajan and kirtan singing. It is one of the main qawali instrument used by Sufi musicians. The instrument is also featured in dance performances such as Kathak. Tabla is a rhythmic instrument. 

The name tabla likely comes from tabl, the Arabic word for drum. The ultimate origin of the musical instrument is contested by scholars, though some trace its evolution from indigenous musical instruments of the Indian subcontinent.

The tabla consists of two small drums of slightly different sizes and shapes. Each drum is made of hollowed out wood, clay or metal. The smaller drum (dayan/tabla) is used for creating treble and tonal sounds, while the primary function of the larger drum (baya/dagga) is for producing bass. They are laced with hoops, thongs and wooden dowels on its sides. The dowels and hoops are used to tighten the tension of the membranes for tuning the drums.

The playing technique is complex and involves extensive use of the fingers and palms in various configurations to create a wide variety of different sounds and rhythms, reflected in mnemonic syllables (bol).

Origins

The history of the tabla is unclear, and there are multiple theories regarding its origins. There are two groups of theories; the first  theorizes the instrument had indigenous origins while the other traces its origins to the Muslim and Mughal conquerors of the Indian subcontinent. While the carvings in Bhaja Caves support the theory that the instrument had indigenous origins, clear pictorial evidence of the drum emerges only from about 1745, and the drum continued to develop in shape until the early 1800s.

Indian origins
The Indian theory traces the origin of tabla to indigenous ancient civilization. The stone sculpture carvings in Bhaja Caves depict a woman playing a pair of drums, which some have claimed as evidence for the ancient origin of the tabla in India. A different version of this theory states that the tabla acquired a new Arabic name during the Islamic rule, having evolved from ancient Indian puskara drums. The evidence of the hand-held puskara is founded in many temple carvings, such as at the 6th and 7th century Muktesvara and Bhuvaneswara temples in India. These arts show drummers who are sitting, with two or three separate small drums, with their palm and fingers in a position as if they are playing those drums. However, it is not apparent in any of these ancient carvings that those drums were made of the same material and skin, or played the same music, as the modern tabla.

The textual evidence for similar material and methods of construction as tabla comes from Sanskrit texts. The earliest discussion of tabla-like musical instrument building methods are found in the Hindu text Natyashastra. This text also includes descriptions of paste-patches (syahi) such as those found on a tabla. The Natyashastra also discusses how to play these drums. The South Indian text Silappatikaram, likely composed in the early centuries of 1st millennium CE, describes thirty types of drums along with many stringed and other instruments. These are, however, called pushkara; the name tabla appears in later periods.

Muslim and Mughal origins
This theory is based on the etymological links of the word tabla to Arabic word tabl which means "drum". Beyond the root of the word, this proposal points to the documentary evidence that the Muslim armies had hundreds of soldiers on camels and horses carrying paired drums as they invaded the Indian subcontinent. They would beat these drums to scare the residents, the non-Muslim armies, their elephants and chariots, that they intended to attack. However, the war drums did not look or sound anything like tabla, they were large paired drums and were called naqqara (noise, chaos makers).

Another version states that Amir Khusraw, a musician patronized by Sultan Alauddin Khalji invented the tabla when he cut an Awaj drum, which used to be hourglass shaped, into two parts. However, no painting or sculpture or document dated to his period supports it with this evidence nor it was found in the list of musical instruments that were written down by Muslim historians. For example, Abul Fazi included a long list of musical instruments in his Ain-i-akbari written in the time of the 16th century Mughal Emperor Akbar, the generous patron of music. Abul Fazi's list makes no mention of tabla.

The third version credits the invention of tabla to the 18th century musician, with a similar sounding name Amir Khusru, where he is suggested to have cut a Pakhawaj into two to create tabla. Miniature paintings of this era show instruments that sort of look like tabla. This theory implies that tabla emerged from within the Muslim community of Indian subcontinent and were not an Arabian import. However, scholars such as Neil Sorrell and Ram Narayan state that this legend of cutting a pakhawaj drum into two to make tabla drums "cannot be given any credence".

History

Drums and Talas are mentioned in the Vedic era texts. A percussion musical instrument with two or three small drums, held with strings, called Pushkara (also spelled Pushkala) were in existence in pre-5th century Indian subcontinent along with other drums such as the Mridang, but these are not called tabla then. The pre-5th century paintings in the Ajanta Caves, for example, show a group of musicians playing small tabla-like upright seated drums, a kettle-shaped mridang drum and cymbals. Similar artwork with seated musicians playing drums, but carved in stone, are found in the Ellora Caves, and others.

A type of small Indian drums, along with many other musical instruments, are also mentioned in Tibetan and Chinese memoirs written by Buddhist monks who visited the Indian subcontinent in the 1st millennium CE. The pushkala are called rdzogs pa (pronounced dzokpa) in Tibetan literature. The pushkara drums are also mentioned in many ancient Jainism and Buddhism texts, such as Samavayasutra, Lalitavistara and Sutralamkara.

Various Hindu and Jain temples, such as the Eklingji in Udaipur, Rajasthan show stone carvings of a person playing tabla-like small pair of drums. Small drums were popular during the Yadava rule (1210 to 1247) in the south, at the time when Sangita Ratnakara was written by Sarangadeva.  Madhava Kandali, 14th century Assamese poet and writer of Saptakanda Ramayana, lists several instruments in his version of "Ramayana", such as tabal, jhajhar, dotara, vina, bīn, vipanchi, etc. (meaning that these instruments existed since his time in 14th century or earlier).There is recent iconography of the tabla dating back to 1799. This theory is now obsolete with iconography carvings found in Bhaje caves providing solid proof that the tabla was used in ancient India. There are Hindu temple carvings of double hand drums resembling the tabla that date back to 500 BCE. The tabla was spread widely across ancient India. A Hoysaleshwara temple in Karnataka shows a carving of a woman playing a tabla in a dance performance.

According to classifications of musical instruments defined in the Natyashastra, Tabla is classified in the Avanadha Vadya category of rhythm instruments which are made by capping an empty vessel with a stretched skin.

Construction and features

The tabla consists of two single-headed, barrel-shaped small drums of slightly different sizes and shapes: baya and daya for left and right drums, respectively.

The smaller drum, played with the dominant hand, is called dayan (literally "right" side), dāhina, siddha or chattū, but is correctly called the "tabla." It is made from a conical piece of mostly teak and rosewood hollowed out to approximately half of its total depth. The daya tabla is played by the musician's right hand (dominant hand), and is about 15 centimetres (~6 in) in diameter and 25 centimetres (~10 in) high. The drum is tuned to a specific note, usually either the tonic, dominant or subdominant of the soloist's key and thus complements the melody. This is the ground note of the raga called Sa (tonic in India music). The tuning range is limited although different dāyāñs are produced in different sizes, each with a different range. Cylindrical wood blocks, known as gatta, are inserted between the strap and the shell allowing tension to be adjusted by their vertical positioning. Fine tuning is achieved while striking vertically on the braided portion of the head using a small, heavy hammer. While tabla usually features two drums, a tabla tarang may consist of 10-16 dayas to perform melodies based on several ragas.

The baya tabla is a bit bigger and deep kettledrum shaped, about 20 centimetres (~8 in) in diameter and 25 centimetres (~10 in) in height. It played with the non-dominant hand, is called bāyāñ (literally "left") duggī or dhāmā (correctly called "dagga"), has a much deeper bass tone, much like its distant cousin, the kettle drum. The bāyāñs can be found to be made up of many different types of materials.  Brass is the most common, copper is more expensive, but generally held to be the best, while aluminum and steel are often found in inexpensive models. Sometimes wood is used, especially in old bāyāñs from the Punjab. Clay is also used, although not favored for durability; these are generally found in the North-East region of Bengal. The baya construction and tuning is about a fifth to an octave below that of the daya drum. The musician uses his hand's heel pressure to change the pitch and tone colour of each drum during a performance.

The head of each drum has a central area of "tuning paste" called the syahi (lit. "ink"; a.k.a. shāī or gāb). Syahi is common in many drums of Indian origin. This method allows these drums to produce harmonic overtones and is responsible for their unique sound.  Syahi is constructed using multiple layers of a paste made from starch (rice or wheat) mixed with a black powder of various origins. The precise construction and shaping of this area is responsible for modification of the drum's natural overtones, resulting in the clarity of pitch (see inharmonicity) and variety of tonal possibilities unique to this instrument which has a bell-like sound. The skill required for the proper construction of this area is highly refined and is the main differentiating factor in the quality of a particular instrument. The earliest discussion of these paste-patches are found in the Hindu text Natyashastra.

For stability while playing, each drum is positioned on a toroidal bundle called chutta or guddi, consisting of plant fiber or another malleable material wrapped in cloth. They are commonly played while sitting cross-legged on the floor.

Musical notation

Indian music is traditionally practice-oriented and until the 20th century did not employ written notations as the primary media of instruction, understanding, or transmission. The rules of Indian music and compositions themselves are taught from a guru to a shishya, in person. Thus oral notation for playing tabla strokes and compositions is very developed and exact. These are made up of onomatopoetic syllables and are known as bols.

Written notation is regarded as a matter of taste and is not standardized. Thus there is no universal system of written notation for the rest of the world to study Indian music. The two popular systems for writing notations were created by Vishnu Digambar Paluskar and Vishnu Narayan Bhatkhande. These notations are named after their respective creators. Both these systems have bols written down in a script such as Latin or Devanagari. The differences arise in representation of various concepts of a compositions, such as Taali, Khaali, Sum (the first beat in a rhythmic cycle), and Khand (divisions). Another difference is the use of numerals in the Vishnu Narayan Bhatkande system to represent matras and beat measures, whereas more sophisticated symbols are used in the Vishnu Digambar Paluskar system to denote one matra, its fractions and combinations.

Basic strokes
Tabla's repertoire and techniques borrow many elements from Pakhavaj and Mridangam, which are played sideways using one's palms. The physical structure of these drums also share similar components: the smaller pakhavaj head for the dayan, the naqqara kettledrum for the bayan, and the flexible use of the bass of the dholak. Tabla is played from the top and uses "finger tip and hand percussive" techniques allowing more complex movements. The rich language of tabla is made up of permutations of some basic strokes. These basic strokes are divided into 5 major categories along with a few examples:
 Bols played on the dayan (right / treble drum)
 Na: striking the edge of the syahi with the last two fingers of the right hand
 Ta or Ra: striking sharply with the index finger against the rim while simultaneously applying gentle pressure to the edge of the syahi with the ring finger to suppress the fundamental vibration mode
 Tin: placing the last two fingers of the right hand lightly against the syahi and striking on the border between the syahi and the maidan (resonant)
 Te: striking the center of the syahi with the middle finger in Delhi gharana, or using middle, ring, and little fingers together in Varanasi style (non resonant)
 Ti: striking the center of the syahi with the index finger (non resonant)
 Tun: striking the center of the syahi with the index finger to excite the fundamental vibration mode (resonant)
 TheRe:  striking of syahi with palm
 Bols played on bayan (left /  bass drum)
 Ghe: holding wrist down and arching the fingers over the syahi; the middle and ring-fingers then strike the maidan (resonant)
 Ga: striking the index finger
 Ka, Ke, or Kat: (on bayan) striking with the flat palm and fingers (non resonant)
 Bols played on both the drums on unison
 Dha: combination of Na and (Ga or Ghe)
 Dhin: combination of Tin and (Ga or Ghe)
 Bols played one after another in a successive manner
 Ti Re Ki Ta
 TaK = Ta + Ke
 Bols played as flam
 Ghran: Ge immediately followed by Na
 TriKe: Ti immediately followed by Ke and Te

Tabla Talas
Tala defines the musical meter of a composition. It is characterized by groups of matras in a defined time cycle. Talas are composed of basic elements, bols. Matra defines the number of beats within a rhythm. Talas can be of 3 to 108 matras. They are played in repeated cycles. The starting beat of each cycle is known as Sum. This beat is often represented by a special symbol such as 'X'. This is the most emphasized beat of the cycle. Other emphasized parts of the tala which are represented by Taali (clap), while Khali (empty) portions are played in a relaxed manner.  They are represented by a 'O' in Vishnu Narayanan Bhatkhande notation.  Tali is often marked by a numeral representing its beat measure. Separate sections or stanzas of a tala are called Vibhagas.

Three main types of tempos or layas are used in playing Tabla talas: 1) Slow (vilambit) or half speed, 2) Medium (madhya) or reference speed, and 3) Fast (drut) or double speed. Keeping these three tempos as reference other variations of these tempos are also defined such as Aadi laya where bols are played at one and a half speed of medium tempo. Others  such as Ati Ati drut laya stands for very very fast tempo.  Modern tabla players often use beats per minute measures as well.

There are many talas in Hindustani music. Teental or Trital is one of the most popular tala played on Tabla. It has 16 beat measures or matras, and can be written down as 4 sections of 4 matras each. Teental can be played at both slow and fast speeds.  Other talas such as Dhamaar, Ek, Jhoomra and Chau talas are better suited for slow and medium tempos. While some flourish at faster speeds, such as like Jhap or Rupak talas. Some of the popular Talas in Hindustani Classical music include:

Rare Hindustani talas

Tabla Gharanas 
Tabla gharanas are responsible for the development of variety of new bols, characteristic playing techniques, composition styles and rhythmic structures. Gharanas acted as a means of preserving these styles between generations of tabla players.  First recorded history of gharanas is in the early 18th century. Delhi gharana is considered to be the first and the oldest traditional tabla tradition. Its students were responsible for the spawn of other gharanas as well. Each of these gharanas include a handful of  prominent players and maestros. They carry the honorific title 'Pandit' and 'Ustad' for Hindus and Muslim tabla players, respectively. Modernization and accessible means of travel have reduced the rigid boundaries between these gharanas in recent times.

The different Gharanas in Tabla
 Delhi Gharana
 Lucknow Gharana
 Ajrada Gharana
 Farukhabad Gharana
 Benares Gharana
 Punjab Gharana

Kayda
A Kayda or Kaida is a type of Tabla composition. There are major two types of tabla compositions, fixed (pre-composed) and improvised (composed and improvised at the time of the practicing or performing). A rhythmic seed (theme) is introduced, which is then used as a basis for elaboration through improvisation and/or composition. The word Kayda is an Arabic or Hindi word which means 'rule' or 'a system of rules'. The rules for playing a kayda are complex, but in short, one must only use the bols that are in the original theme. This original theme is known as a Mukh. The kayda form originated in the Delhi Gharana of tabla playing and serves three fundamental and very important roles for tabla players. The Dayan (Right side tabla - also known as Dagga) and Bayan (Left side tabla - just known as Tabla) of the Tabla are used in synchronization to form a Kayda. Kaydas can be played in any Tala. But in most of the concerts Teental and their Kaydas are played very often. Note that in talas like Dadra and Keherwa or in  like Bhajani,  are played,  are not played. The reason for this is that these  mentioned in the previous line are specifically played for Semi-Classical and light music (Bhajans, Kirtans, Thumris, etc.) and not for Hindustani classical music. Different Gharanas have their own Kaydas.

Basic structure of a kayda -

Mukh - Basic bol which is called as Mukh that means face of the particular Kayda. The kayda's bols are structured out of the Mukh.
Dohara - Dohara is the repetition of the Mukh 3 times. Dohara means to repeat. In Hindi it is called Doharana that means to repeat.
Adha Dohara - Adha Dohara is the repetition of the first bol of the Mukh.
Vishram - Vishram means taking rest. As the name suggests, a minute of pause is taken from the bol.
Adha Vishram - Adha Vishram is the repetition of taking a pause i.e. repetition of the bol that was repeated in Vishram.
Palta - Palta is a variation of various bols but these bols are stuck or are only from the bols which are there in the Mukh. This Palta is a section of the whole Kayda. Now what it means that Palta is a section. It means that like Mukh, Dohara, Adha Dohara, Vishram, Adha Vishram, these 4 names are not or cannot be repeated. So there is no duplications of all the 4 names taken. So all of the 4 names taken above, there are played only once. But a Palta, as said it is a section. joining various bols many such Palte (plural form of Palta) can be created.
Tihai - The musical phrase sung or played thrice to arrive at the Sam/Sum is called a Tithai. It is the last part of a Kayda. The Mukh's last part is played thrice i.e. 3 times and then the particular Kayda is ended.

Just like Kaydas, there are Relas and Ravs (or Raus).

Famous players 

 Ustad Ahmed Jan Thirakwa
 Ustad Alla Rakha
 Ustad Zakir Hussain
 Pandit Yogesh Shamsi
 Pandit Suresh Talwalkar
 Pandit Anindo Chatterjee
 Pandit Kumar Bose 
 Pandit Ramdas Palsule
 Pandit Nayan Ghosh
 Pandit Shubhankar Banerjee
 Pandit Swapan Chaudhuri

See also

Damaru
Dangdut
Doumbek – Arabian drum also known in Egypt as "tabla", "Egyptian tabla", or "Alexandrian tabla".
Madal
Mridanga
Mridangam
Pakhavaj
Tbilat
Drum

Notes

References

Further reading
 The Major Traditions of North Indian Tabla Drumming: A Survey Presentation Based on Performances by India's Leading Artists, by Robert S. Gottlieb. Pub. Musikverlag E. Katzbichler, 1977. .
 The tabla of Lucknow: a cultural analysis of a musical tradition, by James Kippen. Cambridge University Press, 1988. .
 Solo Tabla Drumming of North India: Text & commentary, by Robert S. Gottlieb, Motilal Banarsidass Publ., 1993. .
 Fundamentals of Tabla, (Volume 1) by David R. Courtney. Pub. Sur Sangeet Services, 1995. .
 Advanced Theory of Tabla, (Volume 2) by David R. Courtney. Pub. Sur Sangeet Services, 2000. .
 Manufacture and Repair of Tabla, (Volume 3) by David R. Courtney. Pub. Sur Sangeet Services, 2001. .
 Focus on the Kaidas of Tabla, (Volume 4) by David R. Courtney. Pub. Sur Sangeet Services, 2002. .
 Theory and practice of tabla, by Sadanand Naimpalli. Popular Prakashan, 2005. .

External links

 On Covered Instruments (puṣkara, ‘drums’), Chapter XXXII of the Nāṭyaśāstra

Battle drums
Directly struck membranophones
Hand drums
Pitched percussion instruments
Afghan musical instruments
Bangladeshi musical instruments
Hindustani musical instruments
Indian musical instruments
Pakistani musical instruments
Sri Lankan musical instruments
Tabla players
Articles containing video clips
Drums of Nepal